The Bow River Bridge is a road bridge that spans the Bow River in Banff, Alberta. It was built in 1921 and is currently in use. The bridge is adorned with small stones from the river and locally sourced Rundle rock. The bridge also has 3 Indian head reliefs with headresses on either side.

References 

Road bridges in Alberta
Bridges completed in 1921
1921 establishments in Alberta